The Grandisoniidae are a family of common caecilians found in Africa, Seychelles and India.  Like other caecilians, they superficially resemble worms or snakes. The family was formerly known as Indotyphlidae.

Taxonomy 

The genera in this family were originally placed in family Caeciliidae. In 2011, the genera Gegeneophis, Grandisonia, Hypogeophis, Idiocranium, Indotyphlus, Praslinia and Sylvacaecilia were segregated into family Indotyphlidae, named after the tribe Indotyphlini, which was used by Lescure et al (1986) for the Indian genera, Gegeneophis and Indotyphlus. However, it was later pointed out that the name Grandisoniidae is the appropriate family-group name because, according to rules of the Nomenclatural Code,  a name published at higher rank, Grandisoniinae, has precedence over a name of lower rank published in the same work, Indotyphlini.

Genera and species 

Genus Gegeneophis
Gegeneophis carnosus
Gegeneophis danieli
Gegeneophis goaensis
Gegeneophis krishni
Gegeneophis madhavai
Gegeniophis mhadeiensis
Gegeneophis orientalis
Gegeneophis pareshi
Gegeneophis primus
Gegeneophis ramaswamii
Gegeneophis seshachari
Gegeneophis tejaswini
Genus Grandisonia
Grandisonia alternans 	
Grandisonia larvata
Grandisonia sechellensis
Genus Hypogeophis 
Hypogeophis brevis
Hypogeophis montanus
Hypogeophis pti
Hypogeophis rostratus
Genus Idiocranium 
Idiocranium russeli
Genus Indotyphlus
Indotyphlus battersbyi
Indotyphlus maharashtraensis
Genus Praslinia 
Praslinia cooperi
Genus Sylvacaecilia 
Sylvacaecilia grandisonae

References

AmphibiaWeb: Information on amphibian biology and conservation. [web application]. 2004. Berkeley, California: AmphibiaWeb. Available: http://amphibiaweb.org/. Retrieved 26 August 2004

 
Amphibian families
Amphibians of Africa
Amphibians of Asia